Giorgio Roselli (born 1 October 1957) is an Italian professional football coach and a former player, who played as a midfielder.

Career
Born in Montone, Roselli began playing football with local side Spoleto. In 1975, he signed with Internazionale, where he would make his Serie A debut against Roma on 25 January 1976.

On 1 October 2018, he was hired by Sambenedettese.

On 24 June 2019, he signed with Serie C club Monopoli. After two league games, one win and one loss, he was fired on 2 September 2019.

On 10 January 2020, he was appointed as head coach of the Maltese Premier League team Senglea Athletic. His experience leading the Cottonera side only lasted until the end of February, when he was relieved of his duties by the club.

On 17 February 2021, he was named new head coach of Serie C club Vibonese until the end of the season.

References

External links
Giorgio Roselli at Footballdatabase

1957 births
Living people
Italian footballers
Association football midfielders
Serie A players
Serie B players
Inter Milan players
L.R. Vicenza players
U.C. Sampdoria players
Bologna F.C. 1909 players
Delfino Pescara 1936 players
S.S.C. Bari players
Taranto F.C. 1927 players
U.S. Alessandria Calcio 1912 players
F.C. Pro Vercelli 1892 players
Italian football managers
U.S. Alessandria Calcio 1912 managers
U.S. Triestina Calcio 1918 managers
Mantova 1911 managers
U.S. Cremonese managers
F.C. Grosseto S.S.D. managers
Bassano Virtus 55 S.T. managers
Calcio Lecco 1912 managers
Cosenza Calcio managers
Senglea Athletic F.C.